Stuntman is the name of two action-adventure racing video games; one was developed by Reflections Interactive for the PlayStation 2, and the other by Velez & Dubail for the Game Boy Advance, with both being published by Infogrames under the Atari brand name. The games focus around the career of a motion-picture stuntman. It takes the player through various movies in which they perform dangerous stunts as called by the game.

Critical reaction to Stuntman varied. The game was hailed for its innovative gameplay and physics, but was criticised for being linear and its difficulty level requiring too many retries of levels. The game was followed up with a sequel titled Stuntman: Ignition, in 2007.

Gameplay
Stuntman has three single-player modes: Stuntman Career, Stunt Construction and Driving Games. In Stuntman Career, the player must attempt a series of car chase stunt scenes. Each track has several stunts, which are indicated with visual cues and in voice. The player must complete each track in a limited time and with a specified accuracy of the stunts to be able to proceed to the next scene. After all the scenes of the film are completed, a theatrical trailer of the film is shown that combines pre-rendered scenes with highlights from the car scenes based on the actual performance of the player. After succeeding in a scene, the player is rewarded with money based on accuracy and time, and the unlocking of vehicles and tools for the construction mode. After completing a scene, the player can watch playback and optionally save it.

The career mode allows the player to participate in six films, each filmed in a different location and a different genre. Toothless in Wapping is a gangster film made in London (mainly set within the docks and smaller parts of the downtown area) and resembles Snatch and Lock, Stock, and Two Smoking Barrels (both of which were directed by Guy Ritchie and starring Jason Statham). A Whoopin' and a Hollerin''' is inspired by Dukes of Hazzard set in rural Louisiana. Blood Oath is filmed in Bangkok and is inspired by John Woo-films. Conspiracy is a Tom Clancy-type thriller where the player uses a snowmobile in Switzerland. The Scarab of Lost Souls is based on the Indiana Jones films where the player uses a jeep and troop carrier in Egypt. Live Twice for Tomorrow is a parody of James Bond where the player uses sports cars in Monaco. Between films, the player must perform stunts in front of crowds at a stadium.

The Stunt Construction mode allows the player to create their own stunts by placing equipment in an arena and then perform the stunts. The Driving Games mode involves tests of vehicle control, such as manoeuvrability, precision and timing.

Development
The game was first announced by Reflections on 1 May 2001. and was fully showcased at E3 2001 a week later although no release date was planned at the time. It was rumoured by an Infogrames employee to an IGN reporter that an Xbox version would be planned. Stuntman was also shown off during Infogrames' "Gamers Day" event on 8 November 2001, and was later revealed by the company in December that it would be released within the second quarter of 2002.

It was showcased at E3 2002 a month prior to its release in June. The game's soundtrack contains two songs by Overseer: "Basstrap" and "Velocity Shift".

In April 2003, Infogrames announced a version of the game would be released for the Game Boy Advance, developed by Velez and Dubail, on a modified version of the game engine used for their V-Rally 3 port, and would be released in Europe in June. A North American release was soon confirmed for June as well. In the same month, Infogrames announced that Stuntman and Test Drive would be re-released under Sony's Greatest Hits range, with Stuntman releasing in June, a year after its initial release.

Reception

The Game Boy Advance version received "favorable" reviews, while the PlayStation 2 version received "mixed or average" reviews according to video game review aggregator Metacritic. GameSpot named Stuntman the third-best video game of June 2002.Maxim gave the PS2 version a score of eight out of ten and said, "If you think the best parts of movies involve explosions, car chases, and death-defying leaps (is there anything else?), then this homage to Hollywood’s unsung lunatics is just the thing for you."  However, FHM gave the same version a score of three stars out of five and called it a "Genuinely great idea, but incredibly frustrating."  Entertainment Weekly gave said version a C and advised players to "Wear a helmet while playing, because you'll be banging your head against the TV in frustration."  In Japan, Famitsu'' gave the same version a score of all four sevens for a total of 28 out of 40.

References

External links

2002 video games
Atari games
Infogrames games
Embracer Group franchises
Action-adventure games
Filmmaking video games
Game Boy Advance games
PlayStation 2 games
Racing video games
Video games scored by Allister Brimble
Video games developed in France
Video games developed in the United Kingdom
Video games set in Egypt
Video games set in London
Video games set in Louisiana
Video games set in Monaco
Video games set in Thailand
Video games set in Switzerland
Single-player video games